The Bifidobacteriaceae are the only family of bacteria in the order Bifidobacteriales. According to the 16S rRNA-based LTP release 106 published by 'The All-Species Living Tree' Project, the order Bifidobacteriales is a clade nested within the suborder Micrococcineae, also the genus Bifidobacterium is paraphyletic to the other genera within the family, i.e. the other genera are nested within Bifidobacterium.

Genomics
In a phylogenetic tree for the order Bifidobacteriales, based on RpoB, RpoC, and DNA Gyrase B, Gardnerella vaginalis branches between different Bifidobacterium species, which makes the genus Bifidobacterium polyphyletic. The genus could be made monophyletic if G. vaginalis were placed within Bifidobacterium. Comparative analysis of aligned protein sequences has led to the discovery of two conserved signature indels which are specific for the order Bifidobacteriales. The first indel, a 1 amino acid deletion in ribosomal protein L13, is found in all Bifidobacteriales species and no other Actinomycetota, providing a potential molecular marker for the entire Bifidobacteriales order. The second indel that has been identified is a 1 amino acid insertion in glucose-6-phosphate dehydrogenase found in all Bifidobacterium species and G. vaginalis, but not in any other Actinomycetota. This indel is thus characteristic of the clade consisting of Bifidobacterium species and G. vaginalis and can be used to distinguish these genera from the rest of the order Bifidobacteriales. 16 conserved signature proteins have also been identified which are unique to the order Bifidobacteriales and can be used as molecular markers for this order. Additionally, 6 conserved signature proteins which are unique to Bifidobacterium and Gardnerella have been identified, providing further evidence that species from these two genera are closely related and providing molecular markers for the clade consisting of these genera.

Phylogeny
The currently accepted taxonomy is based on the List of Prokaryotic names with Standing in Nomenclature (LPSN). The phylogeny is based on whole-genome analysis.

Notes

References

External links
Systema Naturae 2000 / Classification - Family Bifidobacteriaceae

Bifidobacteriales
Bacteria families
Bacteria described in 1997